Ivan Tasić (born 8 May 1979) is a Serbian former professional footballer who played as a midfielder.

Career
Tasić made a name for himself at Železnik, amassing 124 appearances and scoring five goals in the top flight between 1999 and 2005. He was a member of the team that won the Serbia and Montenegro Cup in the 2004–05 season.

In 2005, Tasić moved abroad to Greece and joined second league club Kalamata. He would move to the newly promoted first league side Ergotelis in 2006, appearing in 46 league games over the next two years. In 2008, Tasić returned to Kalamata for two seasons, before moving to fellow second league club Levadiakos in 2010.

Statistics

Honours
Železnik
 Serbia and Montenegro Cup: 2004–05

External links
 
 

Association football midfielders
Ergotelis F.C. players
Expatriate footballers in Greece
First League of Serbia and Montenegro players
FK BSK Borča players
FK Železnik players
Football League (Greece) players
Kalamata F.C. players
Kavala F.C. players
Levadiakos F.C. players
Niki Volos F.C. players
Serbia and Montenegro expatriate footballers
Serbia and Montenegro expatriate sportspeople in Greece
Serbia and Montenegro footballers
Serbian expatriate footballers
Serbian expatriate sportspeople in Greece
Serbian footballers
Serbian SuperLiga players
Footballers from Belgrade
Super League Greece players
1979 births
Living people